Eugene Wilbert Moore (born July 29, 1945) is an American former professional basketball player from St. Louis, Missouri. He played college basketball for Saint Louis.

A 6'9" center from Saint Louis University, Moore was selected in the second round of the 1968 NBA Draft by the Milwaukee Bucks and by the Kentucky Colonels in the American Basketball Association draft.

Moore played in the American Basketball Association from 1968 through 1970 for the Kentucky Colonels, and spent the 1970–71 season with the Texas Chaparrals.  After playing for the New York Nets during the 1971–72 season, Moore was selected by the expansion San Diego Conquistadors in the 1972 expansion draft and played two seasons with that team before finishing his ABA career with the Spirits of St. Louis during the 1974–75 season.  Moore averaged 12.0 points per game and 9.4 rebounds per game in his ABA career and appeared in the 1970 ABA All-Star Game.

Moore holds the ABA records for the most personal fouls in a season (382 in 1969–70), the most personal fouls in an ABA career (1,348), and the most disqualifications in an ABA career (43).

References

External links 

1945 births
Living people
American expatriate basketball people in the Philippines
American men's basketball players
Basketball players from St. Louis
Centers (basketball)
Dallas Chaparrals players
Jersey Shore Bullets players
Kentucky Colonels draft picks
Kentucky Colonels players
Milwaukee Bucks draft picks
New York Nets players
Philippine Basketball Association imports
Saint Louis Billikens men's basketball players
San Diego Conquistadors players
Spirits of St. Louis players
Texas Chaparrals players
Tanduay Rhum Masters players